Valerie Bowman is an author of historical romance novels, and specifically Regency romance novels.

Bowman's first book, Secrets of a Wedding Night, was nominated for a Best First Historical Romance Award from RT Book Reviews. The Unexpected Duchess, the first book in Bowman's Playful Brides series, received a starred review from Kirkus Reviews.

In 2014 Bowman appeared in Season 6 of the reality television show Say Yes to the Dress: Atlanta.

Books

Secret Brides series
Secrets of a Wedding Night, St. Martin's Press, 2012 
Secrets of a Runaway Bride, St. Martin's Press, 2013
Secrets of a Scandalous Marriage, St. Martin's Press, 2013

Secret Brides stories and novellas
A Secret Proposal, St. Martin's Press, 2013
A Secret Affair, St. Martin's Press, 2013
It Happened Under The Mistletoe, St. Martin's Press, 2013

Playful Brides series
The Unexpected Duchess, St. Martin's Press, 2014 
The Accidental Countess, St. Martin's Press, 2014
The Unlikely Lady, St. Martin's Press, 2015
The Irresistible Rogue, St. Martin's Press, 2015
The Unforgettable Hero, St. Martin's Press, 2016 (novella)
The Untamed Earl, St. Martin's Press, 2016
The Legendary Lord, St. Martin's Press, 2016
Never Trust a Pirate, St. Martin's Press, 2017
The Right Kind of Rogue, St. Martin's Press, 2017
A Duke Like No Other, St. Martin's Press, 2018
Kiss Me at Christmas, St. Martin's Press, 2018
No Other Duke But You, St. Martin's Press, 2019

Other works
Painless Marketing for Busy Authors, self-published, 2013

References

American women novelists
American romantic fiction novelists
Writers of historical romances
Women romantic fiction writers
21st-century American novelists
21st-century American women writers
Living people
Year of birth missing (living people)